Chandrakant Nimba Patil is a politician from Jalgaon district, Maharashtra.

Political career
Patil is current MLA from the Muktainagar Vidhan Sabha constituency as an independent member. He narrowly defeated Rohini Eknath Khadse of the BJP in 2019 Maharashtra Legislative Assembly election.

Positions held
Member of Maharashtra Legislative Assembly from Muktainagar in the  Maharashtra Legislative Assembly (2019–present)

References

Shiv Sena politicians
1970s births
Living people
People from Jalgaon district
Marathi politicians
Maharashtra MLAs 2019–2024